El Paso is a city in El Paso County, Texas, U.S.

El Paso (Spanish, 'the pass') may also refer to:

Places

United States
 El Paso, Arkansas
 Garlock, California, a ghost town known as El Paso City

 El Paso County, Colorado 
 El Paso, Illinois
 El Paso, Texas 
 El Paso metropolitan area
 El Paso International Airport
 El Paso, Wisconsin
 El Paso (community), Wisconsin

Other countries
 El Paso, Cesar, Colombia
 El Paso, Guyana
 El Paso, La Palma, Canary Islands

Music
 "El Paso" (song), a 1959 song by Marty Robbins
 "El Paso", a song from the 2000 album Bolsa de Agua by The Gourds 
 "El Paso", a song from the 2010 album Taking Back Sunday by Taking Back Sunday

Other uses
 El Paso (film), a 1949 Western film 
 El Paso Corp., a natural gas producer

See also
 
 Old El Paso, a brand of Mexican-style food
 Paso Robles, California or El Paso de Robles